Phagwari (پھگواڑ ی) is a village and union council of Murree Tehsil in the Murree District of Punjab, Pakistan. It is located at 33°58'60N 73°30'0E in the north-west of the tehsil, it is bounded to the north by Dewal, to the west by Rawat, to the south by Potha Sharif and to the east by Kashmir. According to the 1998 census of Pakistan it had a population of 13,060.

References

Union councils of Murree Tehsil
Populated places in Murree Tehsil